Raunheim is a town in Groß-Gerau district in Hesse, Germany and a part of the Frankfurt Urban Region as well as the Frankfurt Rhein-Main Region.

Geography

Location 
Raunheim lies in the Frankfurt Rhein-Main Region between Frankfurt am Main (24 km southwest of downtown) and Mainz on the south bank of the Main, 3 km northeast of Rüsselsheim.

Neighbouring communities 
Raunheim borders in the north on the towns of Hattersheim am Main (Main-Taunus-Kreis) and Kelsterbach, in the east on the district-free city of Frankfurt am Main, in the south on the town of Rüsselsheim, and in the west on the town of Flörsheim am Main (Main-Taunus-Kreis).

Constituent communities 
Raunheim consists of only one constituent community.

History 

In 1425 Count John IV. of Katzenelnbogen bought the villages Seilfurt und Raunheim for 5000 florin from the Lords of Eppstein.

Population development

 1852: 644
 1875: 700
 1895: 1.005
 1910: 1.931
 1939: 3.151
 1946: 3.688
 1961: 6.140
 1967: 12.388 
 2015: 15.636

In 2011 more than half of Raunheim's inhabitants were migrants. According to census data from that year Raunheim and Dietzenbach also had the highest shares of Muslim migrants in Hesse and Germany.

Politics

Town council 

The town council for Raunheim consists of 31 councillors.

Elections in 2016:
SPD   = 16
CDU   = 7
GRÜNE = 4
FDP   = 3
FNR = 1

Mayors since 1947 

 1947 Heinrich Schneiker (SPD)
 1949 Adam Wildmeister (CDU)
 1955 Erwin Lang (SPD),
 1969 Günther Diehl (SPD), 
 1988 Herbert Haas (SPD)
 since 2000 Thomas Jühe (SPD)

Coat of arms 
Raunheim's civic coat of arms have no clear meaning. The charge in the arms is first known from a document dating from 1625. The seal used on the document likely dates back further. The ringlike charge is also seen on 18th-century town limit markers. The arms were granted in 1926.

Town partnerships 
Raunheim maintains partnership links with the following towns:
  Le Teil, département of Ardèche, France
  Trofarello near Turin, Italy

Economy and infrastructure 
The town's advantageous location on the Main and near the airport and Autobahn led to quick growth after the Second World War (1945 population: 3,600) and to its becoming an important industrial location. Several thousand jobs are set to arise soon on the former Caltex refinery's old lands. The aerospace division of the multinational corporation Honeywell is based in Raunheim.

Transport 
The interchange on Autobahn A 3 is about 2 km away. Frankfurt International Airport lies 8 km away. Raunheim also has S-Bahn connections to Frankfurt, Mainz and Wiesbaden.

Being near the airport is not an advantage in every way, since Raunheim lies on the airport approach. With certain wind conditions (officially: operational direction 07), the approaching aircraft fly about 300 m over the town, reaching a noise level of 70 dB, peaking at 90 dB, making Raunheim the airport area community most strongly affected by aircraft noise. This has led the town to develop a noise reduction plan. A citizen initiative is fighting against airport expansion.

Sport and leisure 
Raunheim also has a popular bathing lake right at the edge of the forest.

References

External links 
 Raunheim
 

Groß-Gerau (district)